JGH may refer to:

 J. Gordon Holt (1930–2009), American audio engineer and magazine publisher

 Jewish General Hospital, in Montreal, Canada

 Glendalough railway station, in Western Australia
 Jhang railway station, in Pakistan

See also

JGHS (disambiguation)